Paolo Vittorelli was the pseudonym used by Raffaello Battino (9 July 1915 – 24 March 2003), an Italian journalist-commentator, author and politician of the centre-left. As his public profile grew, he was increasingly referred to as Paolo Battino Vittorelli, the name by which he is identified in most posthumous sources.  He engaged actively in antifascist propaganda work during the war years, most of which he spent exiled in Cairo.

Biography

Family provenance and early years 
Paolo Battino Vittorelli was born (as Raffaello Battino) in Alexandria at a time when Egypt was controlled militarily and politically as part of the British empire. His family identity would have been regarded as Graeco-Italian Jewish. His ancestral roots tracked back to Corfu, which had been ruled from Venice for half a millennium until the end of the eighteenth century, and which remained heavily influenced by Venetian and Italian culture through the nineteenth and early twentieth centuries. Amedeo Battino, his father, had graduated from the University of Athens and then as a newly qualified lawyer moved to Egypt in 1908, attracted by the commercial opportunities and the booming free-wheeling economy which had opened up to European businesses since the Opening of the Suez Canal back in 1864. His mother, born Blanche Caroli, ended up in Alexandria after Giacomo Caroli, her own father (and thereby Raffaello's maternal grandfather) had moved to Egypt following the death of his wife (born Emilia Mattatia, Raffaello's maternal grandmother), and set himself up in business as the owner-manager of a small hotel in Alexandria. Giacomo Caroli was born in Trieste but had moved to Corfu when he married, as his second wife, Emilia Mattatia, who had grown up on the island. The child grew up bilingual, fluent both in Italian and in French, which was the language still favoured by the largely "expatriate European" community of bourgeois businessmen and bureaucrats in Egypt.

"Giustizia e Libertà" in France 
He moved to France in order to complete his law studies in 1936. In France he came into contact with the Rosselli brothers and joined up with their exiled antifascist Justice and Freedom (Giustizia e Libertà; GL) movement. Aldo Garòsci, a leading group member and anti-Mussolini activist who had been in Paris since 1932, suggested that he should use the secret pseudonym "Paolo Vittorelli". It was common for left-wing government opponents to adopt secret code-names in order to confuse the security services. Raffaello Battino's code-name became a new identity, however, which he would retain for the rest of his life, long after the Fascist regime and its officials had lost their leader and fallen from power.   In 1937, based in Paris, Paolo Vittorelli became a contributor to the movement's weekly political magazine which was also named Giustizia e Libertà.

"Giustizia e Libertà" in Egypt
In 1938 comrades sent him back to Italy with instructions to make contact with underground antifascists; but he was intercepted at the frontier by Italian police and returned to France where he was now based until 1940. During May/June 1940 the German army invaded France, leaving the northern half of the country under German military occupation and virtually the entire southern part of the country administered by a pro-German puppet government. The Italian government hastily declared war on France in June 1940 and launched its own invasion from the south-east:  this had little military impact, but it confirmed and strengthened the Rome-Berlin "axis" alliance. During this period, Paolo Vittorelli had been sent on a fund-raising mission to Egypt on behalf of Justice and Freedom. Developments in France made a return to Paris unrealistic, and instead he established a new base for himself in Cairo, where he organised an antifascist "Justice and Freedom - Cairo" group. He managed to establish a relationship of uneasy mutual acceptance with the British, and over the next four years became increasingly effective as an antifascist publicist. Many British administrators still recalled that in the First World War the Italian government had been persuaded to join the fighting on the British side, and were inclined to view an Italian opponent of the Italian government with initial suspicion. As the war progressed, however, the British captured large numbers of Italian prisoners of war whom they detained in camps around Cairo. Vittorelli and his comrades undertook an exhaustive four-year programme of visits to the prisoner of war camps where they engaged with Italian captives and shared their antifascist convictions. In addition, he directed "Corriere degli Italiani", an Italian language GL newspaper produced in Cairo. He also taught "History of Economic Theory" and "International Law" at Cairo University's French Faculty of Jurisprudence.

The fall of fascism
After the arrest of Mussolini in July 1943 and the launch of the long Anglo-American invasion of Italy, from the south, during 1944 Vittorelli made his way to Italy and joined the recently launched anti-monarchist anti-fascist Action Party (PdA). He accepted appointment as editor-in-chief of the Piedmont edition of the party's clandestine newspaper L'Italia Libera, following editor Ginzburg's arrest and death by torture.

Socialist ructions in democratic Italy 
After the return of democracy the Action Party broke apart, formally dissolved on 25 October 1947. There were particularly irreconcilable differences over whether and to what extent the party should be prepared to work with political parties and politicians tainted by former association with fascism. Most comrades swallowed their doubts and switched to the Italian Socialist Party (PSI). At this stage, however, Vittorelli lined up with other purists, including Tristano Codignola, Piero Calamandrei, Aldo Garosci and Giuseppe Faravelli to establish Azione Socialista Giustizia e Libertà ("Socialist Action for Justice and Freedom"), a socialist-democratic political third force which drew intellectually and spiritually on the legacy of the pre-war anti-fascist Giustizia e Libertà movement. The newspaper L'Italia Libera, no longer a clandestine publication, evolved into L'Italia Socialista, a mouth-piece representing Azione Socialista Giustizia e Libertà. Vittorelli served as vice-director of the newspaper alongside Aldo Garosci.

On 8 February 1948 Azione Socialista Giustizia e Libertà gave birth to the Unione dei Socialisti (UdS), a political party created by Ivan Matteo Lombardo. The new party then linked up with other left-leaning political parties to form Unità Socialista. The over-riding objective was to preclude an East German style Moscow-backed political alliance with the Italian Communist Party (PCI) ahead of the critically important a couple of months before the 1948 general election. A year later, following an election outcome which had disappointed socialists and communists alike, a further political coming together on the political centre-left created the Partito Socialista Unitario (PSU). Vittorelli was appointed party deputy secretary and permanent delegate to the re-emerging Socialist International. Finally, on 1 May 1951, a fusion of the Partito Socialista dei Lavoratori Italiani (Italian Socialist Workers' Party; PSLI) and the PSU created a unified party of the non-communist left, the Partito Socialista - Sezione Italiana dell'Internazionale Socialista (PS-SIIS) which rebranded itself in January 1952 as the Partito Socialista Democratico Italiano (Italian Democratic Socialist Party; PSDI). Vittorelli was not entirely comfortable with this outcome.

The so-called "Fraud Law" proposed by the government early in 1953 appalled Vittorelli, as did the attitude of the PSDI to the government proposal to distort general election results by awarding extra parliamentary seats to which ever party gained the most votes. Together with Tristano Codignola, Piero Calamandrei and Aldo Garosci, Vittorelli resigned from the PSDI and joined the Unità Popolare (UP), a newly formed coalition of democrats from the political centre and left which came together to oppose the Fraud Law. The law was passed by parliament, but would be repealed in 1954 without ever having been implemented, apparently because the government, still in power, but with a greatly reduced majority following the 1953 general election, concluded that it was becoming so unpopular with voters as to be electorally counter-productive. The UP failed to achieve significant traction with voters. It nevertheless limped on for several years. On 28 November 1954 the UP party central committee elected Paolo Vittorelli to a senior position as a member of the party executive.

Return to the Socialist mainstream 
In 1957 the UP - including Paolo Vittorelli - re-joined the PSI. In 1963 he was one of seven men elected to membership of the senate by voters in the Basilicata electoral district, whom he represented on behalf of the Socialist Party. The others from Basilicata were Christian Democrats (4) and Communists (2). Across the country the Socialists ranked third, securing 44 of the 315 Senate seats as against 85 for the Communists and 132 for the Christian Democrats. Vittorelli served as a senator for the full (at that time) five-year term, until 1968. During his time in the senate he also found time to publish a translation into Italian of Isaiah Berlin's 1939 biography of Karl Marx. Vittorelli's translation, which appears to have been the first Italian language version produced, appeared in 1967:  it was republished a number of times, most recently in 2021.
The 2004 edition is enhanced by an introduction  from Bruno Bongiovanni.

At the time of unification the architects of the Italian constitution had been derived from the constitutional monarchy of Piedmont-Sardinia, and during the ensuring half century drawn on the example of the highly centralised Anglo-French nation state model. Further centralisation of power with national government had followed during two decades of Fascism. Partly as a reaction against fascism, and partly out of respect for the United States and for neighbouring Switzerland, both of which had emerged from the disastrous first half of the twentieth century without suffering the deathly indignity of military invasion or the destructive impacts of economic collapse, post-war Italy turned towards a federal structure with the 1947 republican constitution.  This involved a progressive devolution of political decision making to the regions. Progress was slow, partly on account of concerns that the "red provinces" of Tuscany and Emilia-Romagna would "turn communist" and somehow become Moscow proxies. That never quite happened, at least not in the terms the doomsters had foreseen; but it was only in 1970, more than two decades after the rest of the 1947 constitution had been implemented, that elections were held for "consigli regionali" ("regional parliaments"). Paolo Vittorelli stood for election in the 1970 Piedmontese regional election as a PSI candidate and was elected. In terms of party votes the Socialists were comfortably outperformed in the election, but no party gained an overall majority and the regional government was therefore a PSI-DC coalition administration. Presidency of the regional parliament alternated between the two parties. Between 23 July 1970 and 3 March 1972 Paolo Vittorelli served as president of the Piedmont regional parliament.

Later during the decade Vittorelli was a founder, in 1979, of the Istituto Studi e Ricerche Difesa ("Institute of Defence Studies and Research"), thereafter serving as the first president of the institute. He also served as editor-director of Lettera Istrid, the journal of the institute.

Editor-politician 
Between June 1969 and May 1976 Vittorelli worked as editorial director at Il Lavoro, a respected PSI daily newspaper produced for the Genoa region. The overall direction of the paper remained, in principle, with Sandro Pertini, but he had been forced to abandon his editorial desk and duties at the paper through his election the previous year to the Presidency of the Chamber of Deputies (the lower house of the Italian parliament), in Rome. In terms of approach, as two experienced socialist pragmatists, Vittorelli and Pertini were evidently broadly aligned politically.

In 1972 Vittorelli stood successfully for election to the Chamber of Deputies as a Socialist Party member for the Torino-Novara-Vercelli electoral district. He served as a member of parliament throughout the 1972-76 and 1976-79 parliamentary sessions.

Between 1976 and 1978 he also took charge at Avanti!, the party's Rome-based mass-circulation daily newspaper. During his two-year incumbency, following the successful precedent set by la Repubblica, Avanti! switched from broad-sheet to tabloid format, with a corresponding increase in the number of pages.   Vittorelli also oversaw the introduction of red ink, used in combination with the traditional black type-script.

Authorship 
During his later decades Vittorelli turned increasingly to writing books. At the 1981 Viareggio Prize awards he was recipient of the President's Prize for his memoires of the (defunct since 1947) Action Party, "L'età della tempesta.  Autobiografia romanzata di una generazione". He followed through in 1998 with a sequel, also based on his knowledge of the Action Party, this time entitled "L'età della speranza. Testimonianze e ricordi del Partito d’Azione" and dealing with what one source identifies as the party's "militant years" ("... agli anni della militanza").

Final years 
Paolo Vittorelli's final years coincided with further ructions among the parties of the left in Italy. During the 1990s the PSI burst apart and collapsed, partly under the weight of its internal contradictions and partly due to the tsunami of corruption scandals which hit the political class at that time. In 1998, taking his lead from Valdo Spini, who was also a former PSI member, Vittorelli joined the Democratici di Sinistra (Democrats of the Left; DS), a coming together of formerly separate centre-left groupings hoping to construct a modern European Social Democratic party.

References 

20th-century Italian journalists
20th-century Italian politicians
20th-century Italian male writers
Action Party (Italy) politicians
Italian Socialist Party politicians
Democrats of the Left politicians
Members of the Regional Council of Piedmont
Deputies of Legislature VI of Italy
Deputies of Legislature VII of Italy
Senators of Legislature IV of Italy
Egyptian people of Italian descent
20th-century Italian Jews
Politicians from Alexandria
Politicians from Rome
Politicians from Turin
1915 births
2003 deaths
Egyptian emigrants to Italy